Delaware's 14th Senate district is one of 21 districts in the Delaware Senate. It has been represented by Democrat Kyra Hoffner since 2023.

Geography
District 14 straddles the border between New Castle County and Kent County, covering all of Smyrna, Clayton, Odessa, Blackbird, and Leipsic, as well as parts of Middletown.

Like all districts in the state, the 14th Senate district is located entirely within Delaware's at-large congressional district. It overlaps with the 8th, 9th, 11th, 28th, and 29th districts of the Delaware House of Representatives. The district borders Maryland to the west and New Jersey along the Delaware River.

Recent election results
Delaware Senators are elected to staggered four-year terms. Under normal circumstances, the 14th district holds elections in presidential years, except immediately after redistricting, when all seats are up for election regardless of usual cycle.

2020

2016

2012

Federal and statewide results in District 14

References 

14
New Castle County, Delaware
Kent County, Delaware